Oberon Books is a London-based independent publisher of drama texts and books on theatre. The company publishes around 100 titles per year, many of them plays by new writers. In addition, the list contains a range of titles on theatre studies, acting, writing and dance.

History 
Oberon Books was founded by James Hogan in 1985. Two of its titles are poet Adrian Mitchell's 1998 stage adaptation of C. S. Lewis's The Lion, The Witch and The Wardrobe for the Royal Shakespeare Company and One Man, Two Guvnors (Richard Bean's modern version of Carlo Goldoni's Servant of Two Masters), a West End and Broadway hit for Britain's National Theatre in 2011 starring James Corden. The NT Live recording of the latter was scheduled to be shown on PBS in late 2020.

 the company has 1600 titles in print, most available as both print and e-books. As well as new plays, Oberon also publishes classic works by playwrights such as J. B. Priestley, Sir Arnold Wesker and Henrik Ibsen.

Oberon's mission expanded to include publishing a "culturally and politically diverse" range of plays. Recent examples include Barber Shop Chronicles by Inua Ellams, The HIV Monologues by Patrick Cash and Chewing Gum Dreams by Michaela Coel.

In December 2019, Oberon Books was acquired by Bloomsbury Publishing to join its longstanding play and performance imprints Methuen Drama and Arden Shakespeare.

Notable contemporary authors 

Abi Morgan
Oladipo Agboluaje
Howard Barker
Neil Bartlett
Richard Bean
Torben Betts
Ranjit Bolt
Tim Crouch
Will Eno
Lara Foot
Jon Fosse
John Fraser
Christopher Fry
Pam Gems
A. C. Grayling
Stephen Adly Guirgis
Tanika Gupta
Sir Peter Hall
Dennis Kelly
Nicolas Kent
Arthur Kopit
Bernard Kops
Bryony Lavery
Nell Leyshon
John Logan
Robert David MacDonald
Mustapha Matura
Glyn Maxwell
Sheridan Morley
Dominique Morisseau
Virginia McKenna
Dorota Masłowska
Douglas Maxwell
John Mortimer
Richard Norton-Taylor
Meredith Oakes
Tamsin Oglesby
John Osborne
Gary Owen
Julia Pascal
Michael Pennington
Barry Reckord
Anya Reiss
Roland Schimmelpfennig
Roy Smiles
Ade Solanke
Aurin Squire
Laura Wade
Anne Washburn
Sir Arnold Wesker
Anna Zeigler

Theatre group partners 
Oberon also publishes plays from the following theatre companies:
Kneehigh Theatre
Complicite
OperaUpClose
Out of Joint
The Red Room Theatre Company

Critical acclaim and awards 
John Logan's Red was the winner of six Tony Awards in 2010, including Best Play and Best Direction (Michael Grandage). Red was also the winner of the 2010 Drama Desk Award for Outstanding Play. The following Oberon plays were also nominated for Olivier Awards in 2010:

 Ìyà Ilé (The First Wife) by Oladipo Agboluaje nominated for Outstanding Achievement in an Affiliate Theatre
 Afghanistan: The Great Game by various authors, nominated for Outstanding Achievement in an Affiliate Theatre
 England People Very Nice by Richard Bean, nominated for Best New Comedy
 Our Class by Tadeusz Slobodzianek, nominated for Best Director for Bijan Sheibani
A number of Oberon playwrights have been nominated for the 2010 Evening Standard Awards:
Richard Bean's The Big Fellah for Best New Play.
Laura Wade's Posh for Best New Play.
Anya Reiss and Atiha Sen Gupta, both nominated for the Charles Wintour Award for Most Promising Playwright
Nominees for the 2010 TMA Theatre Awards include:Mrs Reynolds and the Ruffian by Gary Owen for Best New Play.Spur of the Moment by Anya Reiss for Best New Play."Kursk" by Bryony Lavery for Best Touring Production.
Oberon's previous award winners include:
 A Disappearing Number by Simon McBurney and Complicite, winner of both the Evening Standard Award and the Olivier Award for Best New Play in 2008 
 Bloody Sunday: Scenes from the Saville Inquiry by Richard Norton-Taylor, winner of the Olivier Award for Outstanding Achievement in an Affiliate Theatre in 2006 
 Nell Leyshon, winner of the Evening Standard Award for Most Promising Playwright for Comfort Me With Apples in 2005 
 Torben Betts, winner of the Critics' Award for Theatre in Scotland for Best New Play with The Unconquered, 2007.

John Osborne discovery 
In September 2008 two early playscripts by John Osborne, previously thought to be lost, were discovered in the British Library's archives. Both plays predated Look Back in Anger and were published together for the first time by Oberon Books, as Before Anger.

References 

Publishing companies of the United Kingdom